Nara Hill Protected Zone, is a protected area in Costa Rica, managed under the Central Conservation Area, it was created in 1984 by law 6975 Art. 12.

References 

Nature reserves in Costa Rica
Protected areas established in 1984